László Babály (born 13 November 1977) is a Hungarian sprinter. He competed in the men's 4 × 100 metres relay at the 2000 Summer Olympics. His father also represented Hungary in the 4 × 100 metres relay at the 1980 Summer Olympics.

References

1977 births
Living people
Athletes (track and field) at the 2000 Summer Olympics
Hungarian male sprinters
Olympic athletes of Hungary
Place of birth missing (living people)